KLOC (1390 kHz) is an AM radio station licensed to Turlock, California, and serving the Modesto metropolitan area.  It airs a Spanish-language Catholic radio format and is owned by La Favorita Radio Network, Inc.

KLOC is powered at 5,000 watts using a directional antenna at all times to protect other stations on AM 1390.  The transmitter is on North Montpelier Road in Montpelier, California.  Programming is also heard on 250 watt FM translator K290CN at 105.9 MHz in Hughson, California.

History
The station signed on as KTUR in 1949. In 1962, the station changed its call letters to KCEY. In 1977, when an FM station was added, a new building went up. KCEY played modern country music and had local news and ABC Radio News.

The station was assigned the KYES call letters on March 1, 1986. On March 23, 1987, the station changed its call sign to KMIX and on November 10, 1997, to KVIN. On April 17, 2003, the station became the current KLOC.

References

External links

LOC
Modesto, California
Turlock, California
Mass media in Stanislaus County, California
Radio stations established in 1949
1949 establishments in California